The 1917 Louisiana Industrial football team was an American football team that represented the Louisiana Industrial Institute—now known as Louisiana Tech University—as a member of the Louisiana Intercollegiate Athletic Association (LIAA) during the 1917 college football season. Led by Villis Stephen Pugh in his first and only season as head coach, Louisiana Industrial compiled an overall record of 2–3.

Schedule

References

Louisiana Industrial
Louisiana Tech Bulldogs football seasons
Louisiana Industrial football